Aleksandar Dyulgerov (Bulgarian: Александър Дюлгеров; born 19 April 1990) is a Bulgarian professional footballer who plays as a defender for Pirin Blagoevgrad.

References

External links

1990 births
Living people
Bulgarian footballers
OFC Pirin Blagoevgrad players
PFC CSKA Sofia players
FC Montana players
FC Lokomotiv 1929 Sofia players
PFC Slavia Sofia players
CS Concordia Chiajna players
FC Septemvri Sofia players
SFC Etar Veliko Tarnovo players
First Professional Football League (Bulgaria) players
Liga I players
Expatriate footballers in Romania
Association football defenders
Sportspeople from Blagoevgrad